The Aston Martin DBX is a full-size SUV produced by British car manufacturer Aston Martin since 2020.

Design
The DBX is the first car made at Aston Martin's new facility in St Athan, Wales. According to executive vice president and chief creative officer Marek Reichman, the wheelbase of the DBX stretches as far out as possible for the wheels to be positioned at the corners of the vehicle, which, with the low roofline, creates the illusion of a smaller car, helping make the DBX appear more like a traditional Aston Martin shape. The DBX features swan-hinged doors, while the front grille is the largest ever fitted on an Aston Martin.

Specifications and performance
While related to the Vantage, the DBX is built on its own dedicated platform. Like other Aston Martin models, it is constructed with bonded aluminium panels and extrusions. The powertrain and infotainment technology are borrowed from Mercedes-Benz. Its emissions are NEDC Combined  269g/km and its UK combined mpg is 19.73. A 48-volt electric active roll system counteracts body roll under hard cornering, and the vehicle comes with five driving modes: a default GT, Sport, Sport Plus, Terrain and Terrain Plus with an additional Access mode. An active center transfer case directs torque to the front axle when it is required, and there is also an electronic limited slip rear differential. Adaptive dampers and triple-chamber air springs are both standard, offering a significant range of height adjustment.

In November 2021, a new engine appeared.

Aston Martin DBX707 (2022-)
On 1 February 2022, Aston Martin unveiled their most powerful petrol crossover, called the Aston Martin DBX 707. AMG's MCT 9G-Tronic transmission has also been upgraded to receive "wet clutch" and changed gear ratios. The changes also affected the suspension and steering. At the rear of the car is a carbon spoiler and splitter, as well as a four-barrel exhaust system. The base of the car is equipped with standard 22-inch wheels and 23-inch version is available as optional.
The vehicle was unveiled in Knightsbridge.

Formula One Medical Car 

In 2021, it was announced that the DBX would become the official Formula One Medical Car, joining the Mercedes C63S AMG Estate Medical Car (and later the Mercedes-AMG GT 4-Door for the 2022 season). The DBX Medical Car has a British Racing Green livery with neon yellow accents. It will also join the Aston Martin Vantage as part of Formula One's new safety fleet.

References

External links
 Official website

DBX
Cars introduced in 2020
Mid-size sport utility vehicles
Luxury crossover sport utility vehicles
All-wheel-drive vehicles